RAAF Museum is the official museum of the Royal Australian Air Force, the second oldest air force in the world, located at RAAF Williams Point Cook, Victoria, Australia which is the oldest continuously operating Military Air Base in the world.  The museum displays aircraft of significance to the RAAF from its inception as the Australian Flying Corps to the present. At the direction of Air Marshal Sir George Jones, the RAAF Museum was formed in 1952 and fell under the administration of Headquarters Point Cook until 1988 when it became a separate unit of the RAAF. It is currently overseen by the force's Air Training Wing.

Entry 
Entry to the museum is free.  The operating hours are Tuesday to Friday 10am - 3pm, Weekends and Public Holidays 10am - 5pm.  The museum is closed on Mondays, Christmas Day, and Good Friday.

RAAF Williams (Point Cook) is a working military facility so adult visitors are required to produce photo identification and sign in to gain entry.

Aircraft on display 

Not all of the Museum's collection is permanently exhibited. Among those on display are:

Static display 
Some of the aircraft, helicopters and missiles displayed in different exhibitions are:

Replica Aircraft 
 Bristol Boxkite
 Royal Aircraft Factory B.E.2
 Deperdussin 1910 monoplane

Training Hangar 

 Maurice Farman MF.11 Shorthorn
 Avro 504K
 de Havilland Tiger Moth
 de Havilland Vampire T Mk 35
 CAC Winjeel
 Pacific Aerospace Corporation CT/4A
 Aermacchi MB-326H

Technology Hangar 
 Supermarine Walrus
 Royal Aircraft Factory S.E.5
 Douglas Boston
 de Havilland Vampire F.30
 UH-1B Iroquois
 Bristol Bloodhound SAM

Hangar 180 
 CAC Boomerang
 Consolidated Catalina
 GAF Pika
 GAF Jindivik
 Hawker Demon
 Avro 643 Cadet
 de Havilland DH.84 Dragon
 Bell UH-1 Iroquois
 Cessna O-1 Bird Dog
 Sikorsky S-51 Dragonfly
 CAC Sabre

Outdoors 

 Lockheed C-130E Hercules
 Lockheed C-130H Hercules
 Hawker Siddeley HS 748
 Bristol Freighter
 Lockheed P-3 Orion
 Bristol Bloodhound missile (and launcher)
 de Havilland Canada DHC-4 Caribou

Strike Aircraft Hangar
 McDonnell Douglas F-4E Phantom
 General Dynamics F-111G
 GAF Canberra
 McDonnell Douglas F/A-18 Hornet

Aircraft in storage 

Currently non-displayed aircraft include:
 Avro 707A WD280
 CAC Wirraway
 Douglas C-47 Dakota A65-78
 Gloster Meteor T.7
 Gloster Meteor F.8
 CAC Winjeel
 Lockheed Neptune
 North American Harvard
 Lockheed Ventura
 de Havilland Vampire T.35
 General Dynamics F-111C (A8-125)

Flying display 
The museum conducts an interactive flying display at 1pm (1300) every Sunday, Tuesday and Thursday for visitors. Aircraft include the museum's own CA-18 Mustang, North American Harvard, CAC Winjeel, CT4A Trainer, DH Tiger Moth, Replica Royal Aircraft Factory R.E.8 and Replica Sopwith Pup. Also visiting aircraft from other museums and operators participate in these displays, once the flying display is completed the pilots land and then hold an interactive discussion with the spectators answering any questions they may have.

The RAAF Roulettes aerobatic display team perform at least twice annually replacing the normal Sunday interactive display, performance dates are shared via Social media.

See also

 Aviation Heritage Museum (Western Australia)
 Fighter World
 RAAF Wagga Heritage Centre
 List of aerospace museums

References

External links 

 

History of the Royal Australian Air Force
Aerospace museums in Australia
Air force museums
Museums in Melbourne
Museums established in 1952
Military and war museums in Australia
1952 establishments in Australia
Military history of Victoria (Australia)
Buildings and structures in the City of Wyndham